Global War is a 1979 video game published by Muse Software for the Apple II. It was written in Applesoft BASIC by Alan M. Boyd.

Contents
Global War is a game involving the production of armies, and is a clone of the tabletop board game Risk.

Reception
Alan Isabelle reviewed Global War in The Space Gamer No. 34. Isabelle commented that "The game has attractive features, but is not worth [the price]."

Reviews
Moves #58, p30

References

External links
Entry in the Vanloves Apple II Software Games Section   1983

1979 video games
Apple II games
Apple II-only games
Muse Software games
Strategy video games
Video game clones
Video games developed in the United States